The nine-banded armadillo (Dasypus novemcinctus), also known as the nine-banded long-nosed armadillo or common long-nosed armadillo, is a mammal found in North, Central, and South America, making it the most widespread of the armadillos. Its ancestors originated in South America, and remained there until the formation of the Isthmus of Panama allowed them to enter North America as part of the Great American Interchange.
The nine-banded armadillo is a solitary, mainly nocturnal animal, found in many kinds of habitats, from mature and secondary rainforests to grassland and dry scrub. It is an insectivore, feeding chiefly on ants, termites, and other small invertebrates. The armadillo can jump  straight in the air if sufficiently frightened, making it a particular danger on roads. It is the state small mammal of Texas.

Subspecies
D. n. aequatorialis Lönnberg, 1913
D. n. fenestratus Peters, 1864
D. n. hoplites Allen, 1911
D. n. mexianae Hagmann, 1908
D. n. mexicanus Peters, 1864
D. n. novemcinctus Linnaeus, 1758
North American subspecies exhibit reduced genetic variability compared with the subspecies of South America, indicating the armadillos of North America are descended from a relatively small number of individuals that migrated from south of the Rio Grande.

Description

They are one of the largest species of armadillos. The outer shell is composed of ossified dermal scutes covered by nonoverlapping, keratinized epidermal scales, which are connected by flexible bands of skin. This armor covers the back, sides, head, tail, and outside surfaces of the legs. The underside of the body and the inner surfaces of the legs have no armored protection. Instead, they are covered by tough skin and a layer of coarse hair. The vertebrae attach to the carapace.
The claws on the middle toes of the forefeet are elongated for digging, though not to the same degree as those of the much larger giant armadillo of South America.
Their low metabolic rate and poor thermoregulation make them best suited for semitropical environments.
Unlike the South American three-banded armadillos, the nine-banded armadillo cannot roll itself into a ball. It is, however, capable of floating across rivers by inflating its intestines, or by sinking and running across riverbeds. The second is possible due to its ability to hold its breath for up to six minutes, an adaptation originally developed for allowing the animal to keep its snout submerged in soil for extended periods while foraging. Although nine is the typical number of bands on the nine-banded armadillo, the actual number varies by geographic range.
Armadillos possess the teeth typical of all sloths and anteaters. The teeth are all small, peg-like molars with open roots and no enamel. Incisors do form in the embryos, but quickly degenerate and are usually absent by birth.

Habitat
The nine-banded armadillo evolved in a warm, rainy environment, and is still most commonly found in regions resembling its ancestral home. As a very adaptable animal, though, it can also be found in scrublands, open prairies, and tropical rainforests. It cannot thrive in particularly cold or dry environments, as its large surface area, which is not well insulated by fat, makes it especially susceptible to heat and water loss. Recently, nine-banded armadillo have been found as far north as Virginia, with several studies suggesting this could get more common as temperatures rise.

Range
The nine-banded armadillo has been rapidly expanding its range both north and east within the United States, where it is the only regularly occurring species of armadillo. The armadillo crossed the Rio Grande from Mexico in the late 19th century, and was introduced in Florida at about the same time by humans. By 1995, the species had become well established in Texas, Oklahoma, Louisiana, Arkansas, Mississippi, Alabama, Georgia and Florida, and had been sighted as far afield as Kansas, Missouri, Tennessee, Kentucky, and South Carolina. A decade later, the armadillo had become established in all of those areas and continued its migration, being sighted as far north as southern Nebraska, southern Illinois, and southern Indiana.
The primary cause of this rapid expansion is explained simply by the species having few natural predators within the United States, little desire on the part of Americans to hunt or eat the armadillo, and the animals' high reproductive rate. The northern expansion of the armadillo is expected to continue until the species reaches as far north as Ohio, Pennsylvania, New Jersey and Connecticut, and all points southward on the East Coast of the United States. Further northward and westward expansion will probably be limited by the armadillo's poor tolerance of harsh winters, due to its lack of insulating fat and its inability to hibernate.
As of 2009, newspaper reports indicated the nine-banded armadillo seems to have expanded its range northward as far as Omaha, Nebraska in the west, and Kentucky Dam and Evansville, Indiana, in the east.  In 1995, armadillos were only seen in the southern tip of South Carolina, and within two to three years, they had swept across most of the state. In late 2009, North Carolina began considering the establishment of a hunting season for armadillo, following reports that the species has been moving into the southern reaches of the state (roughly between the areas of Charlotte and Wilmington).
Outside the United States, the nine-banded armadillo ranges southward through Central and South America into northern Argentina and Uruguay, where it is still expanding its range.

Diet
Nine-banded armadillos are generally insectivores. They forage for meals by thrusting their snouts into loose soil and leaf litter and frantically digging in erratic patterns, stopping occasionally to dig up grubs, beetles (perhaps the main portion of this species' prey selection), ants, termites, grasshoppers, other insects, millipedes, centipedes, arachnids, worms, and other terrestrial invertebrates, which their sensitive noses can detect through  of soil. They then lap up the insects with their sticky tongues. Nine-banded armadillos have been observed to roll about on ant hills to dislodge and consume the resident ants. They supplement their diets with amphibians and small reptiles, especially in more wintery months when such prey tends to be more sluggish, and occasionally bird eggs and baby mammals. Carrion is also eaten, although perhaps the species is most attracted to the maggots borne by carcasses rather than the meat itself. Less than 10% of the diet of this species is composed by nonanimal matter, though fungi, tubers, fruits, and seeds are occasionally eaten.

Behavior

Nine-banded armadillos are solitary, largely nocturnal animals that come out to forage around dusk. They are extensive burrowers, with a single animal sometimes maintaining up to 12 burrows on its range. Armadillos mark their territory with urine, feces, and excretions from scent glands found on the eyelids, nose, and feet. Males hold breeding territories and may become aggressive in order to keep other males out of their home range to increase chances of pairing with a female. Territorial disputes are settled by kicking and chasing. When they are not foraging, armadillos shuffle along fairly slowly, stopping occasionally to sniff the air for signs of danger.

Predation
If alarmed, nine-banded armadillos can flee with surprising speed. Occasionally, a large predator may be able to ambush the armadillo before it can clear a distance, and breach the hard carapace with a well-placed bite or swipe. If the fleeing escape fails, the armadillo may quickly dig a shallow trench and lodge itself inside. Predators are rarely able to dislodge the animal once it has burrowed itself, and abandon their prey when they cannot breach the armadillo's armor or grasp its tapered tail. Due to their softer carapaces, juvenile armadillos are more likely to fall victim to natural predation and their cautious behavior generally reflects this. Young nine-banded armadillos tend to forage earlier in the day and are more wary of the approach of an unknown animal (including humans) than are adults. Their known natural predators include cougars (perhaps the leading predator), maned wolves, coyotes, black bears, red wolves, jaguars, alligators, bobcats, and large raptors. By far the leading predator of nine-banded armadillos today is humans, as armadillos are locally harvested for their meat and shells and many thousands fall victim to auto accidents every year.

Reproduction
Mating takes place during a two-to-three month long mating season, which occurs from July–August in the Northern Hemisphere and November–January in the Southern Hemisphere. A single egg is fertilized, but implantation is delayed for three to four months to ensure the young will not be born during an unfavorable time. Once the zygote does implant in the uterus, a gestation period of four months occurs, during which the zygote splits into four identical embryos, attached by a common placenta. They are born in March and weigh . After birth, the quadruplets remain in the burrow, living off the mother's milk for about three months. They then begin to forage with the mother, eventually leaving after six months to a year.

Nine-banded armadillos reach sexual maturity at the age of one year, and reproduce every year for the rest of their 12–to-15 year lifespans. A single female can produce up to 56 young over the course of her life. This high reproductive rate is a major cause of the species’ rapid expansion.

Effect on the environment
The foraging of nine-banded armadillo can cause mild damage to the root systems of certain plants. Skunks, cotton rats, burrowing owls, pine snakes, and rattlesnakes can be found living in abandoned armadillo burrows. Occasionally, the armadillo may threaten the endangered gopher tortoise by aggressively displacing them from their burrows and claiming the burrows for themselves. Studies have shown the fan-tailed warbler habitually follows armadillos to feed on insects and other invertebrates displaced by them.

They are typically hunted for their meat, which is said to taste like pork, but are more frequently killed as a result of their tendency to steal the eggs of poultry and game birds. This has caused certain populations of the nine-banded armadillo to become threatened, although the species as a whole is under no immediate threat.
They are also valuable for use in medical research, as they are among the few mammals other than humans susceptible to leprosy.
In Texas, nine-banded armadillos are raised to participate in armadillo racing, a small-scale, but well-established sport in which the animals scurry down a 40-foot track.

Hoover hog
During the Great Depression, the species was hunted for its meat in East Texas, where it was known as "poor man's pork", or the "Hoover hog" by those who considered President Herbert Hoover to be responsible for the Depression. Earlier, German settlers in Texas would often refer to the armadillo as Panzerschwein ("armored pig").   In 1995, the nine-banded armadillo was, with some resistance, made the state small mammal of Texas, where it is considered a pest and is often seen dead on the roadside. They first forayed into Texas across the Rio Grande from Mexico in the 19th century, eventually spreading across the southeast United States.

References

Further reading

 
 eNature entry
 Nixon, Joshua. Armadillo Expansion, September 14, 2006, retrieved December 3, 2006.
 Trapping the nine-banded armadillo

External links
 View the nine-banded armadillo genome in Ensembl
 

Armadillos
Mammals of the Caribbean
Mammals of the United States
Mammals of Brazil
Mammals of Central America
Mammals of Bolivia
Mammals of Argentina
Mammals of Colombia
Mammals of Ecuador
Mammals of French Guiana
Mammals of Guyana
Mammals of Mexico
Mammals of Paraguay
Mammals of Peru
Mammals of Suriname
Mammals of Trinidad and Tobago
Mammals of Uruguay
Mammals of Venezuela
Fauna of the Plains-Midwest (United States)
Fauna of the Southeastern United States
Least concern biota of North America
Least concern biota of South America
Mammals described in 1758
Taxa named by Carl Linnaeus
Symbols of Texas
Articles containing video clips